The Abolition of Poindings and Warrant Sales Act 2001 was an Act of the Scottish Parliament to abolish the previous practice in which a debtor's goods are priced (poinding) in preparation for the enforced sale of the debtor's possessions (warrant sale). The legislation was introduced in 1999 as a member's bill by Tommy Sheridan MSP, the sole member of the Scottish Socialist Party in the Parliament.

The original draft of the bill proposed that it would have immediate effect, but this was subsequently amended to delay implementation of the bill until 2002, so that alternative means of debt recovery could be devised. The Scottish Executive eventually proposed the Debt Arrangement and Attachment Bill, which became the Debt Arrangement and Attachment Act 2002 and repealed the Abolition of Poindings and Warrant Sales Act.

The Debt Arrangement and Attachment Act was criticised by Sheridan for introducing "a new form of warrant sales".

See also
 List of Acts of the Scottish Parliament from 1999

References

External links

Acts of the Scottish Parliament 2001
Housing in Scotland
Poverty in Scotland
Debt collection
Real property law
Eminent domain
Scots property law